Antonia Truppo (born 14 February 1977) is an Italian actress.  Truppo's television credits include Per amore del mio popolo, Inspector De Luca and Il segreto di Arianna.  Her film credits include The Double Hour, Kryptonite!, They Call Me Jeeg  and Indivisible.

Truppo was born in Naples.

In 2016, she won the David di Donatello for Best Supporting Actress for her performance in They Call Me Jeeg and in 2017 for Indivisible.

Film
 The King of Laughter (2021)

References

External links

Italian television actresses
Italian film actresses
1977 births
Living people
Actresses from Naples
David di Donatello winners